Mayhem on Bear Creek is a collection of Western short stories by Robert E. Howard.  It was first published in 1979 by Donald M. Grant, Publisher, Inc. in an edition of 1,900 copies.  The stories had not previously been collected.

Contents
 "No Cowherders Wanted!"
 "Mayhem and Taxes"
 "Evil Deeds at Red Cougar"
 "The Peaceful Pilgrim"
 "While Smoke Rolled"
 "A Elkins Never Surrenders"
 "Sharp's Gun Serenade"

References

1979 short story collections
Short story collections by Robert E. Howard
Donald M. Grant, Publisher books